Raper is a synonym for a rapist, someone who commits rape. It is also a variation of the English surname Roper, meaning "maker of ropes".

People with the surname
 Aaron Raper (born 1971), Australian rugby league footballer and coach
 The Raper brothers:
 Arthur F. Raper (1899–1979), American sociologist
 Kenneth B. Raper (1908–1987), American mycologist
 Red Raper (1911–1974), American mycologist
 George Raper (1769–1796), naval officer and illustrator
 Henry Raper (1799–1859), naval officer and navigator
 Johnny Raper (1939–2022), Australian rugby league footballer and coach
 Judy Raper (born 1954), Australian chemical engineer
 Matthew Raper (1705–1778), English astronomer and mathematician
 Ron Raper (born 1945), Australian rugby league footballer and coach
 Stanley Raper (1909–1997), English cricketer
 Stuart Raper (born 1965), Australian rugby league footballer and coach

See also
 Battle Raper, series of Japanese fighting games controversial for its simulation of rape

References